The Embassy of Mauritania in London is the diplomatic mission of Mauritania in the United Kingdom.

Gallery

References

External links
Official site

Mauritania
Diplomatic missions of Mauritania
Mauritania–United Kingdom relations
Buildings and structures in the City of Westminster
Victoria, London